Franz Xaver Ziereis (13 August 1905 – 24 May 1945) was the commandant of the Mauthausen concentration camp from 1939 until the camp was liberated by the American forces in 1945.

Early life and SS career
Ziereis was born on 13 August 1905 in Munich, Kingdom of Bavaria, German Empire (now in Bavaria, Germany), where he spent 8 years in elementary school and then began as an apprentice and messenger boy in a department store. In the evenings he studied commerce. In 1922 he went to work as a labourer in a carpentry shop.

Ziereis joined Germany's Reichswehr (army) on 1 April 1924, for a period of 12 years. He was discharged with the rank of sergeant in 1936 and joined the SS on September 30 of the same year. He attained the rank of SS-Obersturmführer and was assigned as a training instructor to the SS-Totenkopfverbände. In 1937 he was given command of a Totenkopfverbände unit and later became a training instructor.

Concentration camp commandant

Zeireis replaced Albert Sauer as commandant of Mauthausen on 9 February 1939 by order of Theodor Eicke, Inspector of Concentration Camps. On 25 August 1939, Ziereis received a promotion to the rank of SS-Sturmbannführer and, on 20 April 1944 he received his final promotion to SS-Standartenführer.

Post-war flight and death 
Ziereis fled with his wife on 3 May 1945. He attempted to hide out in his hunting lodge on the Pyhrn mountain in Upper Austria. He was discovered and arrested on 23 May 1945, by an American army unit. He was shot three times in the stomach while trying to escape and brought to a U.S. military hospital set up at the former Gusen I concentration camp where he died shortly after interrogation by a former inmate of Mauthausen, socialist Hans Maršálek. His corpse was later hung on the fence of Gusen I by former prisoners of Gusen.

References

1905 births
1945 deaths
Mauthausen concentration camp personnel
SS-Standartenführer
Nazi concentration camp commandants
Deaths by firearm in Austria